Bondowoso Regency is a landlocked regency in East Java, Indonesia. It covers an area of 1,560.10 km2, and had a population of 736,772 at the 2010 Census and 776,151 at the 2020 Census. The most common languages are Madurese and Javanese, although Madurese is the majority. The nearest large city is Surabaya, approximately five hours' drive away.

The administrative centre of the regency is the provincial town of Bondowoso, after which the regency in named. Common in most provincial towns is a park in the city centre, called "Alun-Alun"; Bondowoso is no exception. In the backdrop of the park is a view of a mountain ("gunung").

Tourist spots include Kawah Ijen, a crater lake. Kawah Ijen is managed jointly by two local governments, Bondowoso Regency and Banyuwangi Regency. In addition to the crater, other tourist destinations in Bondowoso are Tancak Kembar in Pakem and Air Terjun Belawan Sempol. A hike or climb to the crater takes around 1.5 to 3 hours. Other spots are Gunung Merapi and waterfalls.

Bondowoso town is known for its dessert, "tape" (pronounced "tah-peh"), to the extent that it is named "Tape city". Tape is tapioca with a kind of flour added that acts as a preservative. Medium-sized slices of tape are wrapped in banana leaves and kept in a light container for five days to be fermented prior to being consumed.

There is an Arabic community living in the area for some time, since before the Dutch occupation. They live in a place called "Kampung Arab" (Arabs Compound) on Imam Bonjol Street.

Administrative districts 
The Regency is divided into twenty-three districts (kecamatan), tabulated below with their areas and their population totals from the 2010 Census and the 2020 Census. The former Sempol District, in the far southeast of the regency, which contains the crater lake of Kawah Ijen, has been renamed Ijen District. The table also includes the location of the district headquarters and the number of administrative villages (rural desa and urban kelurahan) in each district.

Megalithic artifacts
There are more than 1000 megalithic artifacts found in the villages around Bondowoso, such as menhirs (standing stones), sarcophagi, statues, dolmens (lying stones or tomb tables) and caves. A common megalith type found in Indonesia is the batu kenong with a shape resembling a local musical instrument. The Bondowoso Regency contains up to 400 batu kenong, the highest concentration in Indonesia. An easily accessible location with a wide variety of megaliths is the Pekauman Site at kilometer 8 on the Jember-Bondowoso road.

Climate
Bondowoso has a tropical monsoon climate (Am) with moderate to little rainfall from May to October and heavy to very heavy rainfall from November to April.

See also 
 
 64.25577279031161, -21.124882657270263 - well done

References

Regencies of East Java